The 2016 Lotto Belgium Tour  is the fourth edition of the Lotto-Belisol Belgium Tour, previous called Lotto-Decca Tour, a women's cycle stage race in Belgium. The tour has an UCI rating of 2.1.

Route

Stages

Prologue
6 September – Nieuwpoort to Nieuwpoort,

Stage 1

7 September – Moorslede to Moorslede,

Stage 2

8 September – Lierde to Lierde,

Stage 3

9 September – Geraardsbergen to Geraardsbergen,

Classification leadership

See also

2016 in women's road cycling

References

External links

Lotto-Belisol Belgium Tour
Lotto-Belisol Belgium Tour
Lotto-Decca Tour